FC Rotor Bishkek is a Kyrgyzstani football club based in Bishkek, Kyrgyzstan that played in the top division in Kyrgyzstan, the Kyrgyzstan League.

History 
19??: Founded as FC Torpedo Frunze.
196?: Renamed FC Selmashevets Frunze.
1992: Renamed FC Selmashevets Bishkek.
1994: Merged with Instrumentalschik Bishkek to FC Rotor Bishkek.

Achievements 
Kyrgyzstan League:
6th: 1996

Kyrgyzstan Cup:

Current squad

External links 
Career stats by KLISF

Football clubs in Kyrgyzstan
Football clubs in Bishkek